was a Japanese samurai lord and daimyo during the Muromachi period.

Biography
Yoshimasa was the son of Shiba Takatsune.

During the Ashikaga shogunate, Yoshimasa held the office of kanrei from 1379 to 1397.

See also
 Shiba clan
 Author of "The Chikubashō"

References

Samurai
Ashikaga clan
1350 births
1410 deaths